Subačius is a city in Panevėžys County, northwestern Lithuania.

History
During World War II, the Jewish community was murdered in a mass execution perpetrated by an Einsatzgruppen of Germans helped by Lithuanian nationalists. Some Jews were shot dead near the town's railway station. Others were transported to Kupiškis, where they were murdered. 80 people were massacred, a monument was built on the execution site.

References

Cities in Lithuania
Cities in Panevėžys County
Vilkomirsky Uyezd
Holocaust locations in Lithuania
Kupiškis District Municipality